Espérance Sportive de Mostaganem, known as ES Mostaganem or simply 'ESM for short,  is an Algerian football club in Mostaganem. The club was founded in 1940 and its colours are green and white. Their home stadium, Mohamed Bensaïd Stadium, has a capacity of 37,000 spectators. The club is currently playing in the Algerian Ligue 2.

On Mars 25, 2018,  ES Mostaganem promoted to the Algerian Ligue Professionnelle 2 after winning 2017–18 Ligue Nationale du Football Amateur "Group West".

On May 28, 2022, ES Mostaganem promoted to the Algerian Ligue 2.

Honours

 Algerian Cup:
Runner-up (2 times): 1962–63, 1964–65

 Algerian Third Division:
Champion (1 time): 2007–08

References

External links
Official fan website

 
Football clubs in Algeria
Association football clubs established in 1940
Es Mostaganem
Algerian Ligue 2 clubs
1940 establishments in Algeria
Sports clubs in Algeria